The 1995 Stevenage Borough Council election took place on 4 May 1995. This was on the same day as other local elections. One third of the council was up for election; the seats which were last contested in 1991. There was also a second seat up for election in Martins Wood ward. The Labour Party retained control of the council, which it had held continuously since its creation in 1973.

Overall results

|-bgcolor=#F6F6F6
| colspan=2 style="text-align: right; margin-right: 1em" | Total
| style="text-align: right;" | 13
| colspan=5 |
| style="text-align: right;" | 20,061
| style="text-align: right;" | 
|-
|colspan="11" bgcolor=""|
|-
| style="background:"|
| colspan="10"| Labour hold

All comparisons in seats and vote share are to the corresponding 1991 election.

Ward results

Bandley Hill

Bedwell Plash

Longmeadow

Martins Wood (2 seats)

Mobbsbury

Monkswood

Old Stevenage

Pin Green

Roebuck

St Nicholas

Shephall

Symonds Green

Wellfield

References

1995
1995 English local elections
1990s in Hertfordshire